– also commonly abridged/known as  or  – is the 34th single by the Japanese idol girl group AKB48. It was released in Japan on December 11, 2013.

The single placed fourth on the Japanese Oricon year-end chart for 2014, with 1,086,491 copies sold in Japan as of December 20, 2014.

Title 
The Japanese title of the single is 76 characters long.

Composition and recording 
The track was composed by Tetsurō Oda. The 16 members to participate in the recording of the title track were selected in a rock–paper–scissors tournament, held among the members of AKB48 and its sister groups on September 18, 2013, at Nippon Budokan.

Release and reception 
The song was premiered live at the Best Hit Song Festival 2013 on November 21, 2013. The single was released on 11 December 2013 in five versions: Type A, Type S, Type N, Type H, and a "theater edition".

According to Oricon, in the first week of release the single sold 1,033,336 copies in Japan, which placed it first on the Oricon Weekly CD Singles chart. The single placed fourth on the Oricon year-end chart for 2014, with 1,086,491 copies sold in the country as of December 20. In 2015, the song placed 1st at the Request Hour Setlist 1035, a series of concerts held in Tokyo Dome City Hall between January 21 and 25 of that year.

Track listings 
The CD tracks 1–2, 4–5 and the DVD tracks 1–3 are the same for all editions. The Theater Edition does not include a DVD.

Type A

Type S

Type N

Type H

Theater Edition

Personnel

Suzukake no Ki no Michi de ... Yaya Kihazukashii Ketsuron no Yō na Mono 
The members who are participated in the recording were determined by the 2013 AKB48 Rock-paper-scissors Tournament. Each participant is listed with her placement result.

Center: Jurina Matsui
 Team A: Ayaka Kikuchi (8), Yukari Sasaki (14), Yūka Tano (7)
 Team K: Maria Abe (5), Rie Kitahara (10), Rina Hirata (3)
 Team B: Shizuka Oya (9), Wakana Natori (6), Reina Fujie (11)
 Kenkyūsei: Mizuki Tsuchiyasu (13), Ami Yumoto (16)
 Team B / SKE48 Team KII: Mina Ōba (4)
 SKE48 Team S / AKB48 Team K: Jurina Matsui (1)
 SKE48 Team E / AKB48 Team K: Nao Furuhata (15)
 NMB48 Team BII: Emika Kamieda (2)
 NMB48 Kenkyūsei: Mizuki Uno (12)

Mosh & Dive 
Source: King Records
 Team A: Anna Iriyama, Rina Kawaei, Minami Takahashi, Yui Yokoyama, Mayu Watanabe
 Team K: Yūko Ōshima, Asuka Kuramochi, Mariya Nagao, Tomu Mutō 
 Team B: Ayaka Umeda, Yuki Kashiwagi, Rena Katō, Haruna Kojima, Haruka Shimazaki
 Team 4: Saho Iwatate, Minami Minegishi, Yuiri Murayama
 Team B / NMB48 Team N: Miori Ichikawa, Miyuki Watanabe
 SKE48 Team KII: Akari Suda
 SKE48 Team E: Rena Matsui
 NMB48 Team N: Sayaka Yamamoto
 HKT48 Team H / AKB48 Team A: Haruka Kodama
 HKT48 Team H: Rino Sashihara
 JKT48 Team J / AKB48 Team B: Aki Takajō

Party is over 
Sung by AKB48.

Center: Nana Owada
 Team A: Anna Iriyama, Rina Kawaei, Minami Takahashi, Yui Yokoyama, Mayu Watanabe
 Team K: Yūko Ōshima, Mariya Nagao
 Team B: Yuki Kashiwagi, Rena Katō, Haruna Kojima, Haruka Shimazaki
 Team 4: Nana Okada, Mako Kojima, Miki Nishino, Minami Minegishi
 AKB48 Kenkyūsei: Nana Owada

Escape 
Sung by SKE48.

Center: Mizuho Yamada

 SKE48 Team S: Anna Ishida, Masana Ōya, Yuria Kizaki,  Yūka Nakanishi, Manatsu Mukaida
 SKE48 Team S  / AKB48 Team K: Jurina Matsui
 SKE48 Team KII: Aya Shibata, Akari Suda, Akane Takayanagi, Airi Furukawa, Mizuho Yamada
 SKE48 Team KII / AKB48 Team B: Mina Ōba
 SKE48 Team E: Rion Azuma, Kanon Kimoto, Nanako Suga, Rena Matsui
 SKE48 Team E / AKB48 Team K: Nao Furuhata
 SKE48 Kenkyūsei: Ryōha Kitagawa

Kimi to Deatte Boku wa Kawatta 
Sung by NMB48.

The center for this song was Nagisa Shibuya.
 Team B / NMB48 Team N: Miori Ichikawa, Miyuki Watanabe
 NMB48 Team N: Mayu Ogasawara, Riho Kotani, Kei Jonishi, Miru Shiroma, Sayaka Yamamoto, Akari Yoshida
 NMB48 Team M: Yui Takano, Sae Murase, Nana Yamada
 NMB48 Team M / AKB48 Team A: Fūko Yagura
 NMB48 Team BII: Yūka Kato, Emika Kamieda, Shu Yabushita
 NMB48 Kenkyūsei: Nagisa Shibuya

Wink wa Sankai 
Sung by HKT48

Center: Nako Yabuki
 Team A / HKT48 Team H: Haruka Kodama
 HKT48 Team H: Chihiro Anai, Aika Ōta, Serina Kumazawa, Rino Sashihara, Natsumi Tanaka, Natsumi Matsuoka, Sakura Miyawaki, Anna Murashige, Aoi Motomura, Madoka Moriyasu
 HKT48 Kenkyūsei: Kanna Okada, Meru Tashima, Mio Tomonaga,  Mai Fuchigami, Nako Yabuki

Charts

Billboard charts

Oricon charts

Release history

References

Release information

Other references

External links 
 CD single profiles on the King Records website
 Type A
 Type S
 Type N
 Type H
 Theater Edition

2013 singles
AKB48 songs
Songs with lyrics by Yasushi Akimoto
King Records (Japan) singles